Vítor Manuel Pereira Pontes (born 16 August 1958) is a Portuguese retired footballer who played as a goalkeeper, and is a manager.

Playing career
Born in Leiria, Pontes started his professional career with local União Desportiva. However, during his 18 years as a senior, he played almost exclusively as a backup, only appearing in seven Primeira Liga matches during his career – five for O Elvas C.A.D. in the 1987–88 season, and two for C.D. Nacional in two years combined.

Coaching career
After retiring in 1994 at age 36 with lowly A.D. Guarda (third division), Pontes began immediately working as a goalkeeper coach with his first club, also going to serve there as an assistant manager. He then coached Leiria's first team for two full seasons after a brief interim spell in 2002, subsequently signing with Vitória S.C. for the 2005–06 campaign and being one of two managers in a season which ended in top level relegation – the other was Jaime Pacheco.

In 2007, Pontes signed with division two side Portimonense SC, and remained there two seasons. On 8 September 2011, after two years out of the managerial scene, he returned to active and União de Leiria, replacing fired Pedro Caixinha. His first game in charge was a 1–0 away win against S.C. Beira-Mar, but he left his post after only one more match, however.

In September 2012, Pontes took over at FC Chibuto in Mozambique. He moved to the China League Two in May 2016, signing with Sichuan Longfor FC.

Other ventures
After leaving Portimonense, Pontes worked as a football pundit for Sport TV, in the channel's domestic and UEFA Champions League coverage.

References

External links

1958 births
Living people
People from Leiria
Portuguese footballers
Association football goalkeepers
Primeira Liga players
Liga Portugal 2 players
Segunda Divisão players
U.D. Leiria players
Vitória S.C. players
O Elvas C.A.D. players
Louletano D.C. players
C.D. Nacional players
F.C. Tirsense players
Portuguese football managers
Primeira Liga managers
Liga Portugal 2 managers
U.D. Leiria managers
Vitória S.C. managers
Portimonense S.C. managers
Portuguese expatriate football managers
Expatriate football managers in Mozambique
Expatriate football managers in China
Portuguese expatriate sportspeople in Mozambique
Sichuan Longfor F.C. managers
Sportspeople from Leiria District